EmazingLights, LLC is a California-based retail company founded in 2010 by company CEO Brian Lim. It is best known for its light show gloves used for modern dance form gloving at rave and electronic dance music festivals. The company is listed as #189 on the Inc. 5000 List for achieving a 2281% growth rate over 3 years of operation and bringing in $5.8 million in revenue in 2013.

Founder Brian Lim appeared as a contestant on ABC's reality competition series Shark Tank on March 13, 2015. Lim accepted a deal from sharks Mark Cuban and Daymond John for $650,000 for 5% equity in the company and 20% of the revenue made from licensing deals.

References

External links
 

Retail companies established in 2010
Companies based in Anaheim, California
Retail companies based in California
American companies established in 2010
2010 establishments in California